"Once Upon a Summertime" is the title of the American version (with lyrics from Johnny Mercer) of a French song written by  Michel Legrand, Eddie Barclay and Eddy Marnay.

The French original is La valse des lilas.

Notable recordings 
Blossom Dearie – Once Upon a Summertime (1958), Blossom Time at Ronnie Scott's (1966)
Tony Bennett – I Wanna Be Around (1963)
Miles Davis – Quiet Nights (1963)
Sarah Vaughan – Star Eyes (1963)
Monica Zetterlund and Bill Evans – Waltz for Debby (1964)
Astrud Gilberto – Look to the Rainbow (1966)
Barbra Streisand – Je m'appelle Barbra (1966)
Oscar Peterson – Walking the Line (1970)
June Christy – Impromptu (1977) with the Lou Levy Sextet
Chet Baker – Once Upon a Summertime (1977)
Maria Farantouri –  17 Songs  (1990)
Betty Carter – It's Not About the Melody (1992)
Betty Carter with Vienna Art Orchestra - Quiet Ways: Ballads  (1997)

References 

Songs with music by Michel Legrand
Songs with lyrics by Johnny Mercer
The Walker Brothers songs
Songs written by Eddy Marnay
Year of song missing
1950s songs